Ilsa, the Wicked Warden (originally released as Greta: Haus Ohne Männer, and also known as Greta, the Mad Butcher, Ilsa: Absolute Power, and Wanda, the Wicked Warden) is a 1977 sexploitation film directed by Jesús Franco and starring Dyanne Thorne. The film is considered to be the third entry in the Ilsa film series, but was not originally filmed with the intent of being as such, despite starring Dyanne Thorne. The film's plot follows Greta, a warden at a psychiatric hospital for young women, and a girl who feigns illness so that she can investigate what happened to her sister who stayed at the hospital.

Ilsa, the Wicked Warden contained scenes of graphic violence, which writer Ric Meyers commented was "sicker" than its predecessor in its depictions. Meyer also opined that the movie had been filmed at the same time as Franco's Barbed Wire Dolls due to the shared cast and setting of the two movies.

Synopsis
Greta (Dyanne Thorne) works as the warden in a psychiatric hospital for young women. Unbeknownst to her, her patient Abby is actually the sister of Rosa, one of the hospital's other patients. Abby has lied in order to get herself admitted so that she can find out what has become of her sister, and, hopefully, to rescue her. However, she is unaware that Greta uses the hospital's inmates to create pornography, often against their will. Abby finds herself at the mercy of Juanna, Greta's lover and leader of several of the hospital's inmates. Juanna tries hard to make Abby respond to her advances but, after she refuses, begins to exploit her.

Cast
Dyanne Thorne as Greta
Tania Busselier as Abbie Phillips
Lina Romay as Juana
Eric Falk as Pablo
Howard Maurer as Greta's lover
Angela Ritschard as Rosa Phillips
Peggy Markoff as No. 14
Esther Studer as No. 24
Jesús Franco as Dr. Milton Arcos (as Jess Franco)
Lorli Bucher as Guard
Esther Moser as No. 18
Sigad Sharaf as No. 20
Sandra L. Brennan
Alex Exler

Release history
Ilsa, the Wicked Warden was originally filmed and released in German, under the title Greta: Haus Ohne Männer. The title was changed and the script was reworked, with new dialog being dubbed for the English-speaking market. Given the inclusion of Dyanne Thorne in the title role, and the similar content and subject matter between the film and the Ilsa series, the small change of character name and other edits made to support it allowed the film to commercially benefit from the popularity of the Ilsa series, despite it not being originally intended as part of the canon.

The film's graphic nature made it—along with the entire Ilsa series—associated with the so-called "video nasties" of the 1980s, and caused the film to be edited for release in some territories.

Reception
HorrorNews.net remarked that the film was "Certainly not a waste of time, just don't expect anything near what Ilsa: She Wolf of the SS originally provided."

References

External links

1977 films
1970s exploitation films
1970s erotic films
1977 horror films
West German films
1970s English-language films
English-language German films
English-language Swiss films
Canadian sexploitation films
Films directed by Jesús Franco
Women in prison films
Films about Latin American military dictatorships
Canadian prison films
German prison films
1970s Canadian films
1970s German films